Haym Ibrahim Papa (born 8 June 1998) is a professional footballer who plays as a defender for Championnat National 2 club Évian. Born in France, he represents the Comoros national team.

International career
Ibrahim made his senior international debut for Comoros in a 2021 FIFA Arab Cup qualification match against Palestine, a 5–1 defeat.

References

External links
 
 

1998 births
Living people
People from Moroni, Comoros
Comorian footballers
Comoros international footballers
Thonon Evian Grand Genève F.C. players
Championnat National 3 players
Association football defenders
Comorian expatriate footballers
Comorian expatriates in France
Expatriate footballers in France